Lawrence F. Scalise (April 25, 1933 – June 12, 2015) was an American politician and attorney in the state of Iowa. He served as Attorney General of Iowa from 1965 to 1966, as a Democrat. He attended the University of Iowa. He died in 2015.

References

1933 births
2015 deaths
Politicians from Des Moines, Iowa
University of Iowa alumni
Iowa Attorneys General
Iowa Democrats
American people of Italian descent